Guangxi Sanhuan Group is a Chinese ceramics manufacturer.  In 2010, the company was selected among a crowded field of competitors to be the official tableware provider for the royal wedding of Prince William of Wales and Kate Middleton.  For use at the wedding and as souvenirs, 16,000 items, including dining plates, coffee cup and saucer sets, commemorative mugs and souvenir plates will be manufactured.

History
The company was established in 1987 and made the transition from state owned enterprise to private company.

References

`

Companies based in Guangxi
Companies established in 1987
Ceramics manufacturers of China
Chinese porcelain
Chinese brands